Scutellum was a genus of trilobite in the family Styginidae.  They lived during the Devonian Period and are most often found in the Atlas Mountain area of Morocco.

References

Styginidae
Corynexochida genera
Devonian trilobites of Africa
Paleozoic life of the Northwest Territories
Paleozoic life of Nunavut
Paleozoic life of Quebec